Djidjrakatsi was a region and a family of the old Armenia c. 400–800.

The ruler in c. 420 was Narseh Djidjrakatsi. The family had the hegemony in Armenia 421 to 422.

See also
List of regions of old Armenia

Early medieval Armenian regions